Insecticide is a chemical used to control insects

Insecticide  may refer to:

Insecticide (video game), a 2008 story-driven action-adventure game by Crackpot Entertainment and published by Gamecock Media Group for the Nintendo DS and Windows.

See also
Incesticide, an album by Nirvana
Insecticidal, a 2005 horror movie